Sergei Georgiyevich Galmakov (- Serhiy Hryhorovych Halmakov; born 16 March 1971) is a former Russian professional footballer. He also holds Ukrainian citizenship.

Club career
He made his professional debut in the Ukrainian Second League in 1992 for FC Zirka Kirovohrad.

References

External links

1971 births
Living people
Russian footballers
FC Zirka Kropyvnytskyi players
FC Metalurh Novomoskovsk players
FC Dnipro players
FC Shakhtar Pavlohrad players
FC Zhemchuzhina Sochi players
FC Lokomotiv Nizhny Novgorod players
Russian Premier League players
Association football defenders